The Krishnan Medal is an Indian geology award given annually by the Indian Geophysical Union. The award is named after M. S. Krishnan, an eminent geologist.

Overview
The Indian Geophysical Union instituted the Krishnan Medal to be awarded each year to an outstanding geophysicist/geologist whose age does not exceed 40 years (on 1 January of the year) for outstanding work in specific branches of geophysics/geology and related geosciences.

Nomination
Nominations each year are called from the members of the Executive Council, past recipients of the medal and past Presidents for the award of the Krishnan Medal and constitute an Expert Committee to make the selection for each year. The medallist is presented with the award at the next annual meeting. Since 1993 a Gold Medal has been awarded to the recipient.

Nominations, along with the bio-data, accompanied by 4 copies of the reprints of 3 important publications of the candidates should be sent to the Secretary, Indian Geophysical Union, by 31 July, of the year.

Recipients
Source: IGU

See also

 List of geology awards
 List of geophysics awards
 List of earth sciences awards

References

Geology awards
Indian awards
Awards established in 1964
Geophysics awards
Earth sciences awards